Discard may refer to:

 Discard Protocol, a service in the Internet Protocol Suite
 Discard (EP), an album by Figurine
 Discard, an alternate name for trim functionality in solid-state drives

See also
 Discards, the parts of a fish which are not kept after cleaning them